Sydney River (2021 pop.: 455) is a community in Nova Scotia's Cape Breton Regional Municipality.

Location 

The community is located at the southern end of Sydney Harbour's South Arm at the mouth of the Sydney River, from which it derives its name. Sydney River is at the interchange between Highway 125 and Trunk 4.

History 
Sydney River was once rural, but became more urban throughout the decades. The town developed into a suburb during the 1960s-1970s.

Sydney River has seen commercial development with the construction of a shopping centre, grocery stores and restaurants.

On May 7, 1992, three employees were murdered and one permanently disabled during a robbery at a McDonald's restaurant.

Demographics 

References 

 Sydney River on Destination Nova Scotia

Communities in the Cape Breton Regional Municipality
Designated places in Nova Scotia
General Service Areas in Nova Scotia